The year 2015 is the 12th year in the history of the Konfrontacja Sztuk Walki, a mixed martial arts promotion based in Poland. In 2015 Konfrontacja Sztuk Walki held 4 events beginning with, KSW 30.

List of events

KSW 30: Genesis

KSW 30 was a mixed martial arts event held on February 21, 2015, at the Poznań Arena in Poznań, Poland.

Background

Results

KSW 31: Materla vs. Drwal

KSW 31 was a mixed martial arts event held on 23, 2015 at the Ergo Arena in Gdańsk, Poland.

Background

Results

KSW 32: Road to Wembley

KSW 32 was a mixed martial arts event held on October 31, 2015, at the Wembley Arena in London, England.

Background

Results

KSW 33: Materla vs. Khalidov

KSW 33 was a mixed martial arts event held on November 28, 2015, at the Tauron Arena in Krakow, Poland.

Background

UFC veteran Tomasz Drwal was expected to face Aziz Karaoglu on his way to a KSW Middleweight Championship bout against winner of the main event of KSW 33, but Drwal pulled out due to a knee injury. He was replaced by Maiquel Falcao.

Ariane Lipski also replaced Kamila Porczyk who pulled out from her match against Katarzyna Lubonska due to injury.

Bonuses:
 Fight of the Night: Artur Sowiński vs. Kleber Koike Erbst
 Performance of the Night: Mamed Khalidov and Karol Bedorf

Results

References

2015 in mixed martial arts
Konfrontacja Sztuk Walki events
Konfrontacja Sztuk Walki events